Brian Renwood (18 August 1935 – 7 November 2021) was an Australian rules footballer who played with Collingwood in the Victorian Football League (VFL).

Notes

External links 

Profile from Collingwood Forever

1935 births
2021 deaths
Australian rules footballers from Victoria (Australia)
Collingwood Football Club players